Santiago Metro Line 4A is one of the seven lines that currently make up the Santiago Metro network in Santiago, Chile. It has six stations and 7.7 km of track. The line intersects with Line 2 at La Cisterna, and with Line 4 at Vicuña Mackenna, both being its termini. It will also intersect with the future Line 9 at Santa Rosa station and acts as a link between these two lines. Its distinctive colour on the network line map is light blue.

In 2015, Line 4A accounted for only 3.1% of all trips made on the metro system with a daily ridership of 56,400; it is the least used line in the system since it does not serve the city centre, as well as being the shortest line in the system.

History
Line 4A was originally conceived as a branch of Line 4, but due to the considerably low demand compared to the Puente Alto service, it was separated from Line 4 and inaugurated as a different service. It was inaugurated by President Michelle Bachelet and opened to the public on August 16, 2006. It runs between La Cisterna station and Vicuña Mackenna station.

On November 29, 2010 Santiago Metro workers struck, halting the service for 17 days. The strike caused major over-crowding on bus services as passengers used them as an alternative to their daily metro rides.

Echeverría: The Ghost Station
Echeverría metro station, built but never opened to the public, is located between La Cisterna station and San Ramón station on the junction of Blas Vial street and Maria Vial in the commune of La Cisterna.
The station remains partially built, with the platforms and footbridge across the highway already finished.

The station has never been completed due to the low density of residents in this area, although it could be finished and opened to the public if the population density increased.

Extensions
The line may be extended in the future to Del Sol station to connect with Line 5. The trench where the extension would run has already been built between the two lanes of the Autopista Vespucio Sur highway, ready for the extension to be laid down if the population were to increase in that part of the city. If built, the extension would serve the communes of La Cisterna, Lo Espejo, Cerrillos and Maipú.

Communes served by Line 4A
This line serves the following Santiago communes from south to north:

 La Florida
 La Granja
 San Ramón
 La Cisterna

Stations
Stations running from east to west

Line 4A data sheet
 Terminal Communes: La Cisterna – La Florida
 Track: Avenida Americo Vespucio Sur, 6 stations
 Construction Method: Open-cut and at-grade.
 Opening Date: August 2006

See also 
List of metro systems
Rail transport in Chile
Transantiago

References

External links
 Metro S.A.
 UrbanRail.net/Santiago
 Santiago Metro Map
 Tarjeta Bip! contactless cards
 Santiago Transit Authority, Transantiago
 Santiago Metro Wikipedia page, in Spanish